Polydrusus is a genus of weevils containing dozens of species, some of which are commonly found in Europe and northeastern North America. They are easily confused with Phyllobius, but are not as closely related as they seem at first glance.

See also
 List of Polydrusus species

References

External links

 

 Weevil

Entiminae